The John Keble Church is a Church of England parish church in Mill Hill, London Borough of Barnet. The church was completed in 1936 and is of a modernist design. It is the only church dedicated to John Keble, one of the leaders of the Oxford Movement. It is a Grade II listed building.

History
The church was designed by D. F. Martin-Smith. It was consecrated in 1936.

On 18 May 1989, the church was designated a grade II listed building.

Notable clergy
 Edward Holland, curate from 1969 to 1972, later Bishop of Colchester
 Robert Atwell, curate from 1978 to 1981, later Bishop of Exeter
 Martin Poll, curate from 1987 to 1990, later Archdeacon for the Royal Navy

List of vicars
 1932–1941: Oswin Gibbs-Smith; first vicar, later Dean of Winchester
 1941–1957: Edward Motley
 1958–1963: Rennie Simpson; later Archdeacon of Macclesfield
 1963–1970: John Ginever
 1971–1979: John Dennis; later Bishop of St Edmundsbury and Ipswich
 1981–2009: Oliver Osmond
 2010–2015: Chris Chivers; later Principal of Westcott House
 2016–present: Simon Rowbory

Gallery

References

External links

 Church website

Mill Hill
Grade II listed buildings in the London Borough of Barnet
20th-century Church of England church buildings
Churches completed in 1936
Anglo-Catholic church buildings in the London Borough of Barnet
Grade II listed churches in London